Vostok (lit. east) is an urban locality (an urban-type settlement) in Krasnoarmeysky District of Primorsky Krai, Russia, located  east from Novopokrovka. Population:

History
It is one of the most isolated settlements of the krai. It was granted urban-type settlement status in 1980.

Economy
Primorsky Ore Mining and Processing Enterprise is the main industrial facility and also the main employer in Vostok. Its specialization is the production of tungsten.

References

Urban-type settlements in Primorsky Krai